Acanthus montanus, also known as bear's breech or mountain thistle and in Igbo; ogwu_ahga (in Agbani, Enugu State Nigeria), is a thinly branched perennial with basal clusters of oblong to lance-shaped glossy, dark green leaves reaching up to  long. The leaves have silver marks, wavy margins and thorns. Spikes of pale pink flowers appear summer to fall. It prefers shady situations and occasional deep watering, but tolerates sunny, dry situations too. Its aggressive roots make this plant perfect for slopes. It is native to tropical areas in western africa.

References

External links
 

montanus
Garden plants of Africa
Garden plants of Europe
Plants described in 1753
Taxa named by Carl Linnaeus